Denys Norenkov (born 25 July 1996) is a  Ukrainian professional footballer who plays as a midfielder for LNZ Cherkasy.

Career
Norenkov is product of youth systems of FC Chornomorets and FC Dynamo Kyiv.

In March 2017 went on loan for FC Helios Kharkiv in the Ukrainian First League.

LNZ Cherkasy and spells in Austria
In summer 2021 he moved to LNZ Cherkasy in Ukrainian Second League. On 11 September he scored his first goal against FC Chernihiv.

In April 2022, Norenkov joined Austrian club ATSV Sattledt, as he was had left Ukraine due to the Russo-Ukrainian War. In July 2022, he moved to Hogo Hertha. In January 2023, Norenkov left Austria and returned to Ukraine, joining his former club, LNZ Cherkasy.

References

External links
 
 

1996 births
Living people
Ukrainian footballers
Ukrainian expatriate footballers
Association football midfielders
Ukraine youth international footballers
FC Chornomorets Odesa players
FC Helios Kharkiv players
Ukrainian Premier League players
FC Zhemchuzhyna Odesa players
FC Volyn Lutsk players
FC Kremin Kremenchuk players
Ukrainian First League players
Ukrainian Second League players
Austrian Regionalliga players
Footballers from Odesa
Ukrainian expatriate sportspeople in Austria
Expatriate footballers in Austria